József Kálmán (born 1 March 1910, date of death unknown) was a Hungarian wrestler. He competed in the men's Greco-Roman lightweight at the 1936 Summer Olympics.

References

External links
 

1910 births
Year of death missing
Hungarian male sport wrestlers
Olympic wrestlers of Hungary
Wrestlers at the 1936 Summer Olympics
Place of birth missing